PQ 17 was the code name for an Allied Arctic convoy during the Second World War. On 27 June 1942, the ships sailed from Hvalfjörður, Iceland, for the port of Arkhangelsk in the Soviet Union. The convoy was located by German forces on 1 July, after which it was shadowed continuously and attacked. The First Sea Lord Admiral Dudley Pound, acting on information that German surface units, including the German battleship Tirpitz, were moving to intercept, ordered the covering force built around the Allied battleships HMS Duke of York and the USS Washington away from the convoy and told the convoy to scatter. Because of vacillation by Oberkommando der Wehrmacht (OKW, German armed forces high command), the Tirpitz raid never materialised. The convoy was the first large joint Anglo-American naval operation under British command; in Churchill's view this encouraged a more careful approach to fleet movements.

As the close escort and the covering cruiser forces withdrew westwards to intercept the German raiders, the merchant ships were left without escorts. The merchant ships were attacked by Luftwaffe aircraft and U-boats and of the 35 ships, only eleven reached their destination, delivering  of cargo. The convoy disaster demonstrated the difficulty of passing adequate supplies through the Arctic, especially during the summer midnight sun. The German success was possible through German signals intelligence and cryptological analysis.

Background
With Operation Barbarossa, the beginning of the German war against the USSR, the British and American governments agreed to send unconditional aid to their Soviet allies. The Beaverbrook-Harriman Anglo-American Mission visited Moscow in October 1941, agreeing to a series of munitions deliveries to the Soviet Union. The most direct way to carry these supplies was by sea around the North Cape, through Arctic waters to the ports of Murmansk and Arkhangelsk. The agreement stated that the Soviet government was responsible for receiving the supplies in Soviet ships at British or American ports. However, since the Soviets did not have enough ships for the quantities of aid being sent by the Western allies to the Soviet Union, British and American ships began to constitute an increasing proportion of the convoy traffic.

Although the defence of the Arctic convoys was the responsibility of the Royal Navy, the American Admiral Ernest King assigned Task Force 39 (TF 39) – built around the carrier  and the battleship  – to support the British.

The first convoy sailed from the United Kingdom in August 1941, two months after the beginning of Operation Barbarossa. By the spring of 1942, twelve more convoys had made the passage with the loss of only 1 out of 103 ships. From then, the threat of attacks on the convoys increased, with the Germans preparing to stop the flow of supplies to the USSR with every means at their disposal, including the basing of heavy ships in Norway. In 1941, the Kriegsmarine had already begun concentrating its strength in Norway in winter, to prevent a British invasion of Norway and to obstruct Allied supply lines to the Soviet Union. The battleship  was moved to Trondheim in January, where she was joined by the heavy cruiser  and in March by the heavy cruiser . The battleships ,  and the heavy cruiser  were also sent to Arctic waters but fell victim to Allied air attacks and had to turn back for repairs. The Germans had bases along the Norwegian coast, which meant, until escort carriers became available, Allied convoys had to be sailed through these areas without adequate defence against aircraft and submarine attack.

British plans

British naval intelligence in June reported the Operation Rösselsprung (Unternehmen Rösselsprung) the German plan to bring out major naval units to attack the next eastbound convoy, east of Bear Island. Thus German forces would operate close to the Norwegian coast, with support of shore-based air reconnaissance and striking forces, with a screen of U-boats in the channels between Svalbard and Norway. Allied covering forces, on the other hand, would be without air support, one thousand miles from their base, and with the destroyers too short on fuel to escort a damaged ship to harbour.

To prevent such a situation, the Admiralty issued instructions on 27 June, which allowed the convoy to be turned back temporarily in order to shorten the distance to the nearest Allied base. In the event, enemy surface movements took place later than expected, making these instructions unnecessary. The Admiralty also stated that the safety of the convoy from surface attack to the westward of Bear Island depended on Allied surface forces, while to the eastward it was to be provided by Allied submarines. Furthermore, the convoy's cruiser covering force was not to go east of Bear Island, unless the convoy was threatened by the presence of a surface force which the cruiser force could fight, nor to go beyond 25° East under any circumstance.

A decoy convoy was also organised to divert enemy forces, consisting of the First Minelaying Squadron and four colliers, escorted by HMS Sirius and HMS , five destroyers, and some trawlers. This diversionary force assembled at Scapa Flow for a week, sailing two days after the convoy. German reconnaissance of Scapa during the period of assembly failed to notice the diversion, which was also not sighted on its passage. The operation was repeated on 1 July, again without success. Additionally on 26 June the Admiralty took the opportunity to pass a westbound convoy QP 13, in conjunction with PQ 17. The former was made up of returning merchant ships from Arkhangelsk, with some ships leaving Murmansk. It consisted of thirty-five ships and was escorted by five destroyers, three corvettes, one anti-aircraft ship, three minesweepers, two trawlers, and, as far as the Bear Island area, one submarine. It was sighted by German aircraft on 30 June and 2 July. However, QP 13 was not attacked, since the German tactic was to concentrate on eastbound (laden) convoys, rather than westbound convoys in ballast.

A fresh ice reconnaissance done on 3 July found the passage north of Bear Island had widened. The senior officer of the escort (SOE), Commander J. E. Broome, preferred to stay in the low visibility on the original route, and to make ground to the eastward.

Covering forces

The convoy's close escort was the First Escort Group (EG1), under Cdr. J Broome, and included six destroyers, eleven corvettes, minesweepers, or armed trawlers, and two anti-aircraft auxiliaries.

As the convoy began its preliminary movements, the covering forces planned by the Admiralty were moving to positions. Hamilton's First Cruiser Squadron left Seidisfjord in the night of 30 June/1 July. It arrived in a covering position north of the convoy on 2 July. The cruisers were not sighted by the Germans until late on 3 July. The heavy cover force was shadowed for a short period while north-east of Iceland on 1 July, while the cruiser screen was refuelling at Seidisfiord. It was shadowed for a short period early on 3 July, while in a covering position south of the convoy. Later that day, course was altered northwards to cross the convoy's track and to reach a position north-west of Bear Island. This would place Victorious within air striking range of the convoy on the morning of 4 July. This was calculated to occur at the same time at which a surface attack was expected to materialise.

Air reconnaissance of the Norwegian harbours had been hindered by weather but information showed German heavy units were probably moving northwards and an air photograph of Trondheim late on 3 July showed that Tirpitz and Hipper had sortied. The flying boat patrol and the two lines of submarines between North Cape and Bear Island were being adjusted to cover the line of approach to the convoy as it moved eastwards. In view of the uncertainty of the two German ships' positions, Rear Admiral Hamilton decided to continue to provide close cover with the cruiser squadron and to pass east of Bear Island.

German forces
Ranged against PQ 17 were the German Navy’s surface and submarine forces.
The U-boat Arm had deployed a patrol group, codenamed Eisteufel, to intercept the convoy; three U-boats were in a patrol line north of the Denmark Strait to give advance warning, and another five further north off Jan Mayen Island.

The Kriegsmarine also had two battlegroups in Norwegian ports, totaling four major ships (the battleship  Tirpitz and the cruisers Hipper, Scheer, and Lützow) and twelve destroyers, ready to carry out a surface attack on the convoy. This was orchestrated as a complex two-stage operation codenamed Rösselsprung; the force was the strongest yet assembled for a convoy attack, but was hampered by a complex command process, with the authority to attack resting with Hitler himself, and a contradictory mission statement; the forces were instructed not only to attack and destroy the convoy, but also to avoid any action that would lead to damage to the capital ships, particularly Tirpitz.

These forces were supported by aircraft of Luftflotte 5, some 243 aircraft based at various airfields in northern Norway.

Convoy movement, covering forces, and escort

The convoy sailed from Hvalfjord on 27 June, under the command of Convoy Commodore John Dowding. In addition to the 34 merchant ships, an oiler (RFA Grey Ranger) for the escort, and 3 rescue ships (Rathlin, Zamalek, and Zaafaran) sailed with the convoy. The escort was made up of six destroyers, four corvettes, three minesweepers, four trawlers, two anti-aircraft ships, and two submarines. The route was longer than earlier convoys, since the ice allowed for a passage north of Bear Island with an evasive detour in the Barents Sea. Moreover, all the convoy was bound for Arkhangelsk, because recent heavy air raids had destroyed most of Murmansk. One ship suffered mechanical failure just out of port and was forced to turn back. Another, SS Exford, turned back after sustaining ice damage.

Part of the convoy ran into drifting ice in thick weather of the Denmark Strait. Two merchant ships were damaged and had to turn back.

Shortly after it entered the open sea, PQ 17 was sighted and tracked by U-456, and shadowed continuously except for a few short intervals in fog. This was augmented by Luftwaffe BV 138s on 1 July. On 2 July, the convoy sighted the returning convoy QP 13. It suffered its first air attack, by nine torpedo aircraft, later the same day. The planes were unsuccessful, one being shot down. At 13:00 on 3 July, PQ 17's destroyer screen was steering east to pass between Bear Island and Spitsbergen.

The escort ship, submarine HMS P-614, attempted to scuttle her but she remained afloat.  sank the abandoned Liberty ship at 08:08. There was an unsuccessful attack by six bombers in the evening.  successfully broke up an air attack on the convoy the same day. Later the same evening, another attack – by 25 torpedo bombers – took place, sinking . Two ships were now sunk, and at least four aircraft were shot down.

Dispersal 

At 12:30 on 4 July, the Admiralty gave Hamilton permission to proceed east of 25° east, should the situation demand, unless contrary orders were received from Admiral Tovey. This was a reversal of previous orders and as no information in Tovey's possession justified this change, Hamilton was ordered to withdraw when the convoy was east of 25° east or earlier at his discretion, unless the Admiralty assured him Tirpitz would not be met. At 18:58 the Admiralty informed Hamilton further information was expected shortly and instructed him to remain with the convoy pending further instructions. At 21:11, the Admiralty sent a message prefixed "Most Immediate" ordering Hamilton to withdraw westwards at high speed. This was due to U-boat information, a fact not shared with Hamilton. At 21:23, the Admiralty—in a message prefixed "Immediate"—ordered the convoy to disperse and proceed to Russian ports owing to threat from surface ships. At 21:36, the Admiralty sent another "Most Immediate" message, ordering the convoy to scatter.

Admiral Hamilton, Commander Broome and Commodore Dowding took these signals to indicate an attack by Tirpitz was imminent. The convoy was immediately ordered to scatter, with the escorting destroyers ordered to join the cruiser force and the merchantmen to proceed independently. The Admiralty's decision and orders would not have been so vehement had only British warships been concerned but the idea the first joint Anglo-American operation under British command might involve the destruction of American as well as British units may well have influenced the decisions of First Sea Lord Pound. The Allied cruiser squadron was already beyond the standing orders set by the Admiralty and if no new orders had gone out, the cruisers would have had to withdraw some time afterwards in any case. The earlier cruiser movement did not influence the tactical situation but in light of later knowledge, the decision was deemed precipitate.

Unbeknownst to the escort and convoy commanders, Tirpitz and its battlegroup was not actually advancing toward the convoy or in the vicinity.  Tirpitz had left Trondheim on July 2 to the port of Vestfjord; the next day, Kriegsmarine Commander-in-Chief Admiral Raeder received permission to move the Tirpitz to Altenfjord to join up with friendly ships. Prior to issuing the orders, Pound visited Whitehall and consulted intelligence officer Lieutenant Commander Norman Denning to confirm that Tirpitz had left Altentfjord.  Though Denning couldn't answer if she was still anchored there he did explain that his sources would have confirmed if the ship had or was about to put to sea at that time.  It would not be until several hours after Pound's orders that Tirpitz was confirmed as still being anchored at Altenfjord.  Although the Tirpitz's battlegroup did set out to open sea on July 5, the operation by surface ships to attack the convoy was canceled and the ships returned to Altenfjord that same day.

Convoy losses

When the order to scatter the convoy was received, it had covered more than half of its route and lost three ships. The consequences for the merchantmen were dire, the ships were spread over a wide area, stripped of mutual protection and their trained escort. As the larger escort vessels retreated from the suspected German surface force, messages on Merchant Navy wavelengths began to be received by the destroyers: "Am being bombed by a large number of planes", "On fire in the ice", "Abandoning ship", "Six U-boats approaching on the surface." With the majority of the escorts ordered to return to Scapa Flow, only the close escort of anti-aircraft auxiliaries, corvettes, minesweepers and armed trawlers was left to protect the scattered ships.

On 5 July, six merchantmen, including SS Fairfield City and SS Daniel Morgan, were sunk by the Luftwaffe and six more by four U-boats. Among the losses that day were SS Pan Kraft, Washington, Carlton, Honomu, the Commodore's flagship ,  and Peter Kerr (Kerr was abandoned after a fire got out of control.) Commodore Dowding's refusal to accept defeat contributed to the rescue of most of the ships that eventually survived the convoy. Reche sank the Potter with a torpedo.

On 6 July, SS Pan Atlantic was sunk by the Luftwaffe and SS John Witherspoon by U-255. On 7–8 July, five more ships were sunk (two by U-255), including SS Olapana and SS Alcoa Ranger. The remaining escort withdrew into the Arctic Ocean on 9 July but the merchant ships suffered no more that day. The last losses were SS Hoosier and SS El Capitan on 10 July. The Luftwaffe flew over 200 sorties and lost only five aircraft in exchange for the eight merchantmen.

On receiving the third order to scatter on 4 July 1942, RNVR T/Lt Leo Gradwell commanding the ASW adapted  Middlesbrough-built trawler HMS Ayrshire (FY 225), concluded that as he was heading north to the Arctic ice shelf, nothing prevented him from escorting merchantmen. Leading his convoy of Ayrshire and three US merchant vessels, the Panamanian-registered Troubador, Ironclad and Silver Sword, he proceeded north, using only a sextant and The Times World Geographic Pocket Book. On reaching the Arctic ice pack, the convoy stuck fast and so the ships stopped engines and then banked their fires. Gradwell arranged a defence, formulated around the fact that Troubador was carrying a cargo of bunkering coal and drums of white paint: the crews painted all the vessels white; covered decks with white linen; and arranged the Sherman tanks on the merchant vessels decks into a defensive formation, with loaded main guns. After a period of waiting and having evaded Luftwaffe reconnaissance aircraft, finding themselves unstuck, they proceeded to the Matochkin Strait. They were found there by a flotilla of corvettes, who escorted the four-ship convoy plus two other merchant vessels to the Russian port of Archangel, arriving on 25 July. Gradwell was awarded the Distinguished Service Cross on 15 September 1942.

In the voyage to the Russian ports, some of the ships and lifeboat craft took refuge along the frozen coast of Novaya Zemlya, landing at Matochkin. The Soviet tanker Azerbaijan had lost her cargo of linseed oil and much of SS Winston-Salems cargo had been jettisoned in Novaya Zemlya.

Many of the ships' locations were unknown, in spite of searches by Coastal Command aircraft, which had proceeded to north Russia after their patrols, and by minesweepers and corvettes in the waters. A fortnight elapsed before the results of these attacks and the fate of the various ships of the convoy were fully known. Of the 34 ships which had left Iceland, 23 were sunk and 11 made port. Two British, four American, one Panamanian and two Russian merchant ships reached Arkhangelsk. Two American ships, the SS Samuel Chase and Benjamin Harrison, docked at Murmansk.

Aftermath
Prime Minister Winston Churchill called the event, "one of the most melancholy naval episodes in the whole of the war." An inquiry assigned no blame to anyone, since orders were issued by the First Sea Lord, and blaming the First Sea Lord himself was considered politically unacceptable. The Soviet Union did not believe so many ships could be lost in one convoy and openly accused the Western Allies of lying. Despite the help provided by the material delivered, PQ 17 actually worsened Soviet-Allied relations over the short term, with the Soviets never acknowledging the efforts of Allied merchant seaman or sailors in either navy. Joseph Stalin, and Soviet naval experts, found it difficult to understand the order to scatter given by the Admiralty, given "that the escorting vessels of the PQ 17 should return, whereas the cargo boats should disperse and try to reach the Soviet ports one by one without any protection at all." Admiral King, already known to distrust the British, was furious with what he perceived as Admiral Pound's bungling and promptly withdrew TF 39, sending it to the Pacific. He hesitated to conduct further joint operations under British command.
Admiral Dan Gallery, USN, serving in Iceland at that time, called PQ 17 "a shameful page in naval history".

In view of PQ 17, the Admiralty proposed to suspend the Arctic convoys at least until the ice receded and perpetual daylight passed. At a conference with Hitler, Kriegsmarine Commander-in-Chief Admiral Raeder stated, "...our submarines and aircraft, which totally destroyed the last convoy, have forced the enemy to give up this route temporarily..." At a meeting with the head of the Soviet Military Mission, Admiral Nikolay Kharlamov and the Soviet ambassador in London, Ivan Maisky, the Soviets requested to know the scheduled departure of PQ 18. Pound said nothing could be done until better Russian air cover was arranged, after which Kharlamov criticised the order to withdraw the cruisers from PQ 17. Pound was furious, and deeply resented the Russian attitude. Pound angrily admitted that PQ 17 was scattered by his personal order while Maisky stated that "even British admirals make mistakes".

It was not until September that another convoy set out for North Russia. The convoy's defence scheme was revised, with a very strong constant close escort of sixteen destroyers and the first of the new escort carriers, herself equipped with twelve fighters. After the war there was criticism of this incident, both from American and Soviet sources. Soviet historians give varying reasons for the suspension and reduction in supply caused by the halt in the Arctic convoys. Some considered it the result of "the fact that in 1942, Anglo-American (ocean) communications were destroyed."

At least sixteen officers and men of the Merchant Navy were honoured for gallantry or distinguished service for the actions in the convoy. A supplement to the London Gazette published on 6 October 1942 carried notification of two George Medals, six appointments to various grades of the Order of the British Empire, six British Empire Medals and two King's Commendation for Brave Conduct.

In December 2012 the Arctic Star medal was created and on 19 March 2013 the first medals were presented to approximately 40 veterans, in London.

Broome v Cassell & Co Ltd, the David Irving Libel Case
In 1968, David Irving published a controversial book about PQ 17. It concentrated on Allied blunders and shortcomings, alleging that Broome's decision to withdraw his destroyers was the primary cause of the disaster to the convoy. Broome mounted a libel action, Broome v Cassell & Co Ltd, to defend his reputation. He was successful, winning £40,000 in damages and securing the withdrawal of all copies of the offending book from circulation (it has since been republished, with corrections.) The damages payment (donated by Broome to charity) was the highest paid in legal history until Jeffrey Archer's controversial action against the Daily Star newspaper.

In popular culture
 Action in the North Atlantic, a 1943 war movie starring Humphrey Bogart and Raymond Massey, includes a section which is drawn from Lt. Gradwell's actions after PQ-17 scattered.
 The Captain, a 1967 novel based on the experiences of this convoy by Dutch writer Jan de Hartog, also translated into Dutch as De kapitein.
 A Northern Saga, a 1976 novel written by Steven C. Lawrence, a World War II U.S. merchant marine officer, recounts the story of PQ-17.
 Requiem for Convoy PQ-17, a novel by Valentin Pikul is dedicated to the fate of the convoy. The book is also interesting since it describes the Soviet belief that Soviet submarine K-21 hit the Tirpitz. From 2003–04, a film was released in Russia based on this book.
 Requiem for Convoy PQ-17 is also the title of a dance, orchestra, and choir piece based on the events surrounding the sinkings. Choreographer and dancer Bill Coleman's father was a merchant mariner on board the Bolton Castle.
 In January 2014, the hour-long BBC Two documentary PQ17: An Arctic Convoy Disaster, written and narrated by Jeremy Clarkson, retold the story of the convoy with first-hand testimony from the men who served.

See also
 Convoy battles of World War II

Notesa.'''  This latter signal was intended merely as a correction of technical wording from "disperse" to "scatter", but this was not known at the time. The order to scatter was only used under immediate threat of surface attack. Detailed instructions in each ship's signal book laid down the actions that were to be taken by each ship on receipt of this order.

Footnotes

References
 
 
 
 
 
 
 
 
 
 
 
 
 
 
 
 
 
 
 
 
 
 
 
 

Further reading
 
 
 

External links
 U.S. Naval Historical Center account of PQ 17
 Description of Rösselsprung 
 The Requiem on Convoy PQ-17, Russian novel by Valentin Pikul
 Memoirs of Chief Steward Horace Carswell DSM, MM, BEM during Convoy PQ.17
 Coxswain Sid Kerslake of armed trawler "Northern Gem" in PQ.17
 Convoy PQ.17, a primary source diary and supporting material by Jack Bowman, ERA aboard HMS La Malouine''.
 PQ 17 at Convoyweb
 

PQ 17
Naval battles of World War II involving Germany
C
White Sea